The Paraná do Urariá is a river of Amazonas state in north-western Brazil. It is a side channel that connects the Madeira River (via the short Paraná do Canumã) and Amazonas River (via Paraná do Ramos). The Maués Açu, Apoquitaua, Paraconi, Abacaxis and Canumã Rivers all flow into the Paraná do Urariá.

The  Urariá Sustainable Development Reserve, created in 2001, is on the left bank of the Paraná do Urariá.

See also
List of rivers of Amazonas

References

Brazilian Ministry of Transport

Rivers of Amazonas (Brazilian state)
Tributaries of the Amazon River